Xushui railway station is a station on Beijing–Guangzhou railway and Tianjin–Baoding intercity railway in Xushui District, Baoding, Hebei.

History 
The station was opened in 1899.

The station was expanded in 2014 due to the construction of the Tianjin–Baoding intercity railway. The expansion was finished in 2015 and passenger services resumed on 10 January 2016.

References 

Railway stations in Hebei
Stations on the Beijing–Guangzhou Railway
Stations on the Tianjin–Baoding Intercity Railway